The Greek Orthodox monastery of Saint George is located in Deir el-Harf in the midst of a pine forest that covers Ras el-Matn Mountain in Lebanon. Situated on an open hill at 1050m, the monastery oversees the Mediterranean Sea as well as the Mountains and is at only 33 km from the capital Beirut.
Its exact construction date is unknown but the available documents reveal that it dates back to the 5th century. 
It has a simple architectural style: an open courtyard and a church that gathers the Orthodox inhabitants of the village. 
The iconostasis is wooden and the church is decorated with a rare collection of icons while rare frescoes cover its walls vaults.

References

Greek Orthodox monasteries
Baabda District